Vonda is a given name. Notable people with the name include:

Vonda Kay Van Dyke, crowned the 1965 Miss America on September 13, 1964
Vonda N. McIntyre (1948–2019), American science fiction author
Vonda Phelps, American child stage actress and dancer in the 1920s
Vonda Shepard (born 1963), American pop/rock singer
Vonda Ward (born 1973), American female boxer and NCAA basketball player

See also
Vonda, Saskatchewan, located on Highway 27, a half-hour drive north east of Saskatoon, Saskatchewan